Henry Taylor FRCO (born 1859) was an organist and composer based in England.

Life

He was born in 1859 in Derby, the son of Joseph Taylor and Elizabeth Holbrook. He married Anne Maria, and they had the following children
Charles Henry Taylor b. 1886
George Harold Taylor b. 1888

In 1886, he was elected a Fellow of the Birmingham and Midland Musical Guild. In 1892 he received the degree of Mus Bac from Cambridge University.

Appointments

Assistant Organist of Ripon Cathedral 1876–81
Organist of Church of Christ the Consoler Skelton-cum-Newby 1876–81
Organist of St John's Church, Ladywood Birmingham 1881–1903
Organist of St Bartholomew's Church, Edgbaston Birmingham 1903– ????

Compositions

His compositions included works for choir and organ.

References

1859 births
English organists
British male organists
English composers
Fellows of the Royal College of Organists
Year of death missing